Senjed Gol is a village in Shahr Meyan Rural District, in the Central District of Eqlid County, Fars Province, Iran. At the 2006 census, its population was 37, in 7 families.

References 

Populated places in Eqlid County